John Bartlett may refer to:

Politics
John Bartlett (Connecticut politician) (1677–1761), member of the Connecticut House of Representatives from Norwalk
John Bartlett (Newfoundland politician) (died 1925), ship's captain and politician in Newfoundland
John Russell Bartlett (1805–1886), librarian and Rhode Island politician
John H. Bartlett (1869–1952), governor of New Hampshire
John Bartlett (Australian politician) (1949–2008), New South Wales politician
John Bartlett (Indiana politician), Democratic politician

Sports
John W. Bartlett, football manager
John Bartlett (cricketer) (1928–2014), English former cricketer
John Bartlett (tennis) (born 1948), pro Australian tennis player from the early 1970s
John Bartlett (racing driver) (born 1955), former WSCC racing driver and team owner in the 1980s

Other
John Barthlet or Bartlett ( 1566), English theological writer
John Bartlett (minister) (1784–1849), minister, founder of Massachusetts General Hospital
John Knowlton Bartlett (1816–1889), Vice President of the American Medical Association
John Bartlett (publisher) (1820–1905), publisher of Bartlett's Familiar Quotations
John Russell Bartlett (naval officer) (1843–1904), American naval officer, admiral, and oceanographer
John Vernon Bartlett (1927–2021), British civil engineer
John Bartlett (botanist) (1945—1986), New Zealand plant collector and botanist
John Bartlett (sportscaster), Canadian sportscaster
John G. Bartlett, American physician and medical researcher

See also
John Bartlett Angel (1913–1993), Canadian educator, businessman and volunteer
John Bartlet, English composer
John Bartlet (divine), English nonconformist divine